Saint Vincent and the Grenadines competed at the 2015 World Aquatics Championships in Kazan, Russia from 24 July to 9 August 2015.

Swimming

Swimmers from Saint Vincent and the Grenadines have achieved qualifying standards in the following events (up to a maximum of 2 swimmers in each event at the A-standard entry time, and 1 at the B-standard):

Men

Women

References

External links
 Kazan 2015 Official Site

Nations at the 2015 World Aquatics Championships
2015 in Saint Vincent and the Grenadines
Saint Vincent and the Grenadines at the World Aquatics Championships